Art Collector (foaled February 11, 2017 in Kentucky) is an American Thoroughbred racehorse who won the 2021 Woodward Stakes, the 2023 Pegasus World Cup and the Grade II Charles Town Classic twice.

Racing career

Two-Year-Old Season
Art Collector won a maiden and allowance race as a 2-year-old for trainer Joe Sharp.

Three-Year-Old Season
Racing as a three-year-old for trainer Thomas Drury Jr., Art Collector's win in the Grade 2 Blue Grass Stakes over eventual Preakness Stakes winning filly Swiss Skydiver earned him a berth in 2020 Kentucky Derby. Art Collector's Blue Grass victory was the colt's first graded stakes race and first graded stakes win for trainer Thomas Drury Jr. who has been training racehorses for thirty-eight years.

He then won the 2020 Ellis Park Derby before heading to the Kentucky Derby.

Made the second choice of the betting public behind Belmont Stakes and Travers Stakes winner Tiz the Law, an injury during a workout kept Art Collector out of the Derby, and instead he aimed towards the Preakness Stakes, the third leg of the COVID-19 pandemic affected 2020 Triple Crown.

Art Collector came fourth in the 2020 Preakness Stakes, a nose behind the third place finisher. The filly he defeated in the Bluegrass, Swiss Skydiver, won the Preakness by a neck over Kentucky Derby winner Authentic.

His next start was the Breeders' Cup Dirt Mile on November 7, where he finished eighth behind the winner Knicks Go.

In the 2020 World's Best Racehorse Rankings, Art Collector was rated on 119, making him the equal 57th best racehorse in the world.

Four-Year-Old Season

Art Collector began his 4YO campaign in June at Churchill Downs in the Kelly's Landing Overnight Stakes as the 6/5 favorite with a lackluster performance after veering at the start and being bumped to finish sixth. Art Collector was transfer to trainer William I. Mott's barn in July.

On 6 August, Art Collector made amends winning the Listed Alydar Stakes at Saratoga as the 9/5 favorite with plenty in hand after leading by nearly 4 lengths to finish  lengths in front of Night Ops in a time of 1:48.20 for the  miles trip. 

Three weeks later on 27 August, Art Collector traveled to West Virginia for the Grade II Charles Town Classic where he stalked leader Sleepy Eyes Todd and overtook him in the stretch run and comfortably won by  lengths in a time of 1:49.39.

On 2 October, Art Collector produced his best performance of his career defeating a strong field of six runners to capture his first Grade I event, the Woodward Stakes at Belmont Park.

Statistics

Legend:

 
 

Notes:

An (*) asterisk after the odds means Art Collector was the post-time favorite.

Pedigree

External links
 Race video of Art Collector's 2020 Ellis Park Derby win

References

2017 racehorse births
Thoroughbred racehorses
American racehorses
Racehorses bred in Kentucky
Racehorses trained in the United States
Thoroughbred family 11-g